The Last Fling is a 1987 American made-for-television romantic comedy film directed by Corey Allen, written by Mitchel Katlin, and starring John Ritter and Connie Sellecca.

Plot 

Divorce attorney Phillip Reed is tired of one-night stands. Seeing his friends, couple Linda and Jack, he commiserates the lack of romance in his life. Everywhere he feels he sees happy couples.  

At a football game Gloria Franklin, who is getting married in two weeks, finds out her fiancé Jason is going to Vegas for a bachelor party weekend. Unhappy he'd so nonchalantly 'forget' to mention it and he is so convinced she couldn't have one last fling, she takes it as a challenge.

At the zoo Phillip meets Gloria, who tells him her name is Marsha Lyons. They hit it off right away, and Gloria/Marsha promises Phillip she will call him. A few times she almost tells him she's engaged, but doesn't. 

At work Phillip listens to clients complain about why their marriages are not working. Taking a break, he goes out of the office with his workmate Drew. All Phillip can talk about is Marsha, and Drew doesn't understand. Phillip bumps into Joanie, a woman he's been seeing casually, and breaks it off. 

Gloria/Marsha doesn't plan to ever call Phillip, but her friend Mimi encourages her and then her call to Jason in Vegas is answered by another woman. Feeling betrayed, Gloria/Marsha calls Phillip and asks him to go to Mexico with her early the next morning.

The two have an adventure getting there when the car they rented catches fire. They hitch a ride with some local farm workers. Finally, they make it to Gloria/Marsha's parents' beautiful home. They have a blast in Acapulco, dining and dancing, eventually winding up in bed together. The next morning Phillip gets up to find Gloria/Marsha has already left.

Phillip finds out from a videotape explanation left by Gloria/Marsha that she is getting married in a week and that he was supposed to be her last fling. Phillip goes to work on Monday, telling Drew and Bev at work what happened. Drew points how virtually impossible it is to locate her in only a week.

Meanwhile Gloria is with Mimi, who is gushing over the wedding dress. Gloria is distraught, and when pressed as to why, instead of mentioning Phillip laments over how predictable and dull their life will be. That evening, when Jason asks what she did over the weekend, Gloria completely tells the truth but sarcastically so he believes she's joking. When he scolds her for not loading the dishwasher 'correctly' as he had shown her, she flies off the handle.

Late to the courthouse, Phillip is feeding pidgeons on a bench when Walt from his newsstand comes by, with his wife of 30 years. When he asks how he knew Sophia was the one, he said he just knew. Walt wishes Phillip luck in finding his love in time. Invigorated, Phillip goes to the courthouse and asks the judge to put off the Fields's hearing to give them time to reconsider.

Then Phillip tries to find Gloria/Marsha. Flying to Acapulco, he breaks into the beach house and gets a name off of a pill bottle before he's arrested. Drew gets him out of jail and back in LA he locates Mrs. Franklin, but she has her son throw him out.

Now knowing Gloria/Marsha's last name is Franklin and she lives downtown, Phillip sends dozens of roses to each downtown Franklin with a note to Marsha, asking her to not get married. Gloria/Marsha calls him and he insists they meet. At the zoo, she talks up from the underpass, insisting it's too late, listing all the  things they'd have to cancel, but is not able to say she doesn't love him and then hops on a bus. 

As she'd said her fiancé's name is Jason Elliot, Phillip finds his address in the phonebook and just misses her. However Jason inadvertently says her name is Gloria and the wedding is in a downtown hotel. He gets Linda and Jack to drive to all the major hotels seeking the wedding, and then finds it in the third. When he does, he tries to stop the wedding and convince Gloria that they belong together. 

In the end, Gloria leaves the groom at the altar, and she and Phillip go for a walk in the zoo where they first met.

Cast

 John Ritter as Phillip Reed
 Connie Sellecca as Gloria Franklin
 Randee Heller as Mimi
 John Bennett Perry as Jason Elliot
 Paul Sand as Jack
 Scott Bakula as Drew
 Kate Zentall as Lynda
 Shannon Tweed as Joanne Preston
 Larry Gelman as Walt
 Gretchen Wyler as Mrs. Franklin
 Andrew Masset as Doug
 Janet Wood as Nancy
 Bea Silvern as Sophia
 Michael Alldredge as Larry Fields
 Paddi Edwards as Mrs. Reed 
 Steve Kahan as Amigo de Jason 
 Jamie Bozian as Andrea 
 H.B. Haggerty as Portero hotel
 Lillian Lehman as Recepcionista hotel
 Mario Lopez as Car Rental Clerk

Reception 
John J. O'Connor of The New York Times wrote that the film "tries hard, and often rather amiably, to be what used to be known as a romantic romp" but "gives us silliness that keeps toppling into stupidity."

References

External links 
 

1987 television films
1987 films
1987 romantic comedy films
ABC network original films
American television films
Films shot in Los Angeles
American romantic comedy films
Films directed by Corey Allen
1980s American films